Fasedown are a Christian hardcore band from Fresno, California, that formed in late 1998. Members have also been in Once Dead, The Blamed, Deliverance, The Sacrificed, and many more. In 2015 vocalist Devin Shaffer had "throat setbacks" according to HM Magazine.

Members
 Last Known / Current Line-Up
 Jim Chaffin - Drums (1998-2007, 2009-2011) (Deliverance, The Crucified, The Blamed, Once Dead)
 Devin Shaffer - Vocals (1999-2007, 2009-2011) (Once Dead)
 Mike Phillips - Lead Guitar (1998-2007, 2009-2011) (ex-Deliverance, The Sacrificed, Join the Dead)
 Gary Douglas - Rhythm Guitars (2009-2011)
 Tim Kronyak - Bass (2009-2011) (ex-Deliverance, Join the Dead)

 Former
 Jesse Gibson - Rhythm Guitar (2005-2007)
 Dana Veit - Bass (2005)
 John Hansen - Bass (1998-2005) (ex-The Blamed)
 Matt "MattMan" Hopson-Walker - Bass (2005-2007)

Discography
 Demo (1999-2000; Independent)
 Fasedown (2000; Rescue)
 Blitz of Anguish (2005; Hematocrit)

References

Musical groups established in 2000
Musical groups disestablished in 2006
Musical groups reestablished in 2009